The Dissected Till Plains are physiographic sections of the Central Lowlands province, which in turn is part of the Interior Plains physiographic division of the United States, located in southern and western Iowa, northeastern Kansas, the southwestern corner of Minnesota, northern Missouri, eastern Nebraska, and southeastern South Dakota.

The Dissected Till Plains were formed by pre-Wisconsin glaciations during the Pre-Illinoian Stage. Glacial scouring and deposition by the Laurentide Ice Sheet and the later accumulation of loess during the Wisconsin Stage left behind the rolling hills and rich, fertile soils found today in the region.

The region is also the western edge of the Corn Belt.

Geology
As a part of the Central Lowland geomorphic province. It is a glacier till plain from flat to rolling plain that slopes towards either the Missouri or Mississippi rivers. It is  moderately dissected. The region is pocketed by small human landform,  i.e., strip-mines among a hummocky or ridge-swale topography. Streams drain and erode the area, moving soils and depositing them downstream.

Bedrock appears along the margins.  Cretaceous shale and sandstone occur in the northwestern corner, the Nebraska, Minnesota and Iowa boundary section. Permian sandstone is along the western margin or the Missouri Valley.  Pennsylvanian shale, limestone, and  coal is beneath nearly the entire geologic unit. Mississippian, Devonian and Ordovician shale and carbonate are the bedrock along the eastern and southern areas. Bedrock is visible along the deeper drainage's and in eroded "windows" of the unconsolidated surface soils.

Geography
The Dissected Till Plains is a sub-unit of the Central Lowlands in the Interior Plains of North America. It is centered on the Iowa-Missouri state line. The eastern border is the Mississippi River and bounded on the south by the Missouri River Valley across central Missouri. Its northern border is a line dipping from the Sioux River valley of South Dakota and Minnesota, south into Iowa along a line demarking the Missouri valley from the interior lowlands of Iowa, then curving northward again on a line demarking the interior lowlands of Iowa, from the Mississippi River valley on the east.
 
Missouri – The northern tier from the Missouri Valley between St. Louis and Kansas City north to the Iowa border.
Iowa – A ‘U’ shaped area including the Missouri River valley on the west and the Mississippi hill country on the east.
Kansas – Eight counties in the northeast corner.
Minnesota – Three counties in the southwestern corner along the Sioux River and eight counties in the southeast in the Mississippi River hill country around Rochester.

References

Regions of the United States
Landforms of Iowa
Landforms of Nebraska
Landforms of South Dakota
Landforms of Minnesota
Landforms of Kansas
Landforms of Missouri
Regions of Missouri
Physiographic sections